An ant is a eusocial insect that belongs to the same order as wasps and bees.

Ant, Ants, or ANT may refer to:

Arts, entertainment, and media

Fictional entities
 Ant (Image Comics), a character from Image Comics
 Ant (DC Comics), a superhero from DC Comics
 Ant, a character from the show WordWorld

Film and television
 A.N.T. Farm, a TV series
 Afghanistan National Television
 It Happened at Lakewood Manor or Ants, a 1977 TV film starring Suzanne Sommers and Robert Foxworth

Music
 The Ants, an English punk rock band formed in spring 1977, later better known as Adam and the Ants
 "ANTS", a song by Xiu Xiu from OH NO

Written media
 Ant (newspaper) (Turkish 'Oath'), a left-wing weekly publication in Turkey
 The Ants, a Pulitzer Prize-winning reference book about ants
 Les Fourmis or The Ants, a series of French novels by Bernard Werber

Other media
 American Negro Theater, formed in the Harlem neighborhood of Manhattan in New York City
 Microsoft Ants, a free multiplayer PC game

Organisations and enterprises
 Advanced Network Technology, a division of the US National Security Agency; see NSA ANT catalog
 Aids to Navigation Team, of the United States Coast Guard
 Alliance for National Transformation, a political party in Uganda
 Ant Financial, a Chinese payment-processing company
 Armée Nationale Tchadienne, the native name of the Chad National Army

People
 Ant (name), English language nickname abbreviated from the given name Anthony/Antony, as well as a surname, given name and stage name
Ant (comedian), stage name of Anthony Steven Kalloniatis
Adam Ant, stage name of Stuart Goddard, an English singer and frontman of the rock band Adam and the Ants

Places
 Ant, Lucknow, a village in Lucknow district, Uttar Pradesh, India
 Ant, a village in Avram Iancu, Bihor County, Romania
 Ant Atoll, part of the Senyavin island group in the Federated States of Micronesia
 Antigua and Barbuda (IOC Country code)
 County Antrim, former county in Northern Ireland, Chapman code
 Netherlands Antilles (ISO 3166-1 alpha-3 country code)
 River Ant, a river in Norfolk, England

Science, technology, and mathematics

Computing
 ANT (network), a wireless personal area network protocol
 Apache Ant, a Java-based software build system
 Turmite or ant, a type of Turing machine
 Web crawler or ant

Mathematics
Algebraic number theory, a branch of pure mathematics
 Algorithmic Number Theory Symposium, a symposium on Algorithmic Number Theory

Other sciences
 Actor–network theory, an approach to social theory and research
 Adenine nucleotide translocator
 Anacamptis (abbreviation Ant), a genus of orchids
 Antenna noise temperature
 Antlia, constellation abbreviation as standardized by the International Astronomical Union
 Automatic negative thoughts, in psychology

Other uses
 Ant (chair), a modern chair designed by Arne Jacobsen
 ANT, a designation for aircraft designed by Andrei Nikolayevich Tupolev
An-Naml ("The Ant" or "The Ants"), the twenty-seventh sura of the Qur'an
 HMS Ant, several ships of the Royal Navy

See also

 Ain't
 ANT1, a Greek broadcaster
Anth (disambiguation)
 Antony (disambiguation)
 Ants (given name), an Estonian given name
 Antz, an animated film
 Aunt
 Langton's ant, a two-dimensional Turing machine with a very simple set of rules